Sabawon Wahid Shamohammad (born 10 December 1998) is a Norwegian footballer currently playing for Eik Tønsberg.

Career

Club
In August 2017, Shamohammad signed his first professional contract with Sandefjord.

In the summer of 2018 he was loaned out to crisis-stricken third-tier club IF Fram Larvik. He went back to Sandefjord at the end of 2018.

Shamohammad left Sandefjord and joined Flint instead in February 2019. A year later, in February 2020, Shamohammad joined FK Eik Tønsberg.

Career statistics

Club

References

1998 births
Living people
People from Stokke
Norwegian footballers
Association football midfielders
Sandefjord Fotball players
IF Fram Larvik players
Norwegian First Division players
Eliteserien players
Sportspeople from Vestfold og Telemark